Maranao is an Austronesian language spoken by the Maranao people in the provinces of Lanao del Norte and Lanao del Sur in the Philippines, and in Sabah, Malaysia.

Iranun was once considered a dialect of Maranao.

Unique among other Danao languages, Maranao is spoken with a distinct downstep accent, as opposed to stress accent. Additionally, Maranao features aspirated "hard consonants", which also raise the quality of following vowels.

Distribution
Maranao is spoken in the provinces of Lanao del Sur and Lanao del Norte and in northwestern Maguindanao, northwestern Cotabato, and northwestern Bukidnon, all of which are located in the island of Mindanao in southern Philippines.

Writing system
It is now written with Latin letters. Though there is no officially proclaimed standard orthography, Maranao is more or less written as influenced by contemporary Filipino conventions. The following are the letters used in writing out native words:

A, B, D, E, G, H, I, K, L, M, N, NG, O, P, R, S, T, U, W, Y 

The final  sound in diphthongs and "w" were marked with "-o" in older orthographies, as in other Philippine languages, but both are nowadays spelled as "w". Also, "i" was used in older orthographies to transcribe , which is currently spelled as "Y".

"Di" or "j" are used to transcribe the  sound, such as radia/ (from the Sanskrit word for 'king', "Rāja") or the English name John.

In representing the mid central vowel (or schwa) , different authors have employed various means to represent this sound (e.g. "E" or "U"). Meanwhile, the Commission on the Filipino Language recommends spelling this sound using "Ë" for different Philippine languages in its 2013 Ortograpiyang Pambansa.

In a revised Maranao Dictionary by McKaughan and Macaraya in 1996, the digraph "'ae" was introduced and used to represent the supposed presence of the vowel . However, analysis by Lobel (2009, 2013) showed that this may actually be an allophone of  after hard consonants. McKaughan and Macaraya also used "q" for the glottal stop regardless of position.

The orthography used in the study by Lobel (2009) was the one developed by Aleem Abdulmajeed Ansano of Taraka (1943–2008), Senator Ahmad Domocao "Domie" Alonto of Ramain (1914– 2002), and Shaiekh Abdul Azis Guroalim Saromantang of Tugaya (1923–2003). In this orthography, the "hard consonants"  are written as "ph, th, kh, z".

Phonology
Below is the sound system of Maranao including underlying phonetic features.

Vowels
Maranao has four vowel phonemes that can become more close or higher when in certain environments (see hard consonants below).

Vowel [e] only occurs in loanwords from Spanish thru Tagalog or Cebuano and from Malay.

Consonants
According to Lobel (2013), Maranao has the following consonants:

In Maranao,  is not phonemic word-initially (similar to non-Philippine English). Hence,  ('friend of mine') is smoothly pronounced .

Since the heavy consonants developed from consonant clusters, they are only found word-medially.

Fricative [h]
According to Lobel (2013),  only occurs in a few recent Malay loanwords:
 'God'
 'astrological sign'
 'in front (of God)'
Earlier Arabic loanwords with "h" that entered Proto-Danao or earlier Maranao were realized as k.

 'halal (anything that is permissible in Islam)'
 'haram (anything not permissible in Islam)', 
 'hadji (title for a man who has made the Hajj pilgrimage to Mecca)'
 'Hadith'

Consonant elongation
Consonants are also pronounced longer if preceded with a schwa . However, this process is not a form of gemination since consonant elongation in Maranao is not distinctive as seen in other Philippine languages such as Ilokano and Ibanag. Some of these are:
  'get off a vehicle'
  'startled; surprised'

Hard consonants and vowel raising 
Since 2009, it has been proposed that previous studies on the phonology of Maranao had overlooked the presence of "heavy" consonants, these four "heavy" consonants being . Vowels that follow these consonants are raised in position.
There are four possible environments for that determine whether the vowel will be raised or not:

 Non-raising – 
 Obligatory raising – 
  is pronounced as  instead of 
 Optional raising – 
 Transparent –  – the raising from the consonant before it will "pass through" and affect the following vowel.

Historical development 
Consonant cluster homogenization occurred in earlier Danao and Subanon, where the articulations of the first consonant followed that of the second (Ex: *-gp- > *-bp-).

A study by Allison noted that Proto-Danao *b, *d, g* were lost in modern Maranao when found before other consonants with the same place of articulation (Ex: *bp > *p), but preserved elsewehere.

Lobel noted that this sound change actually resulted in two features of Maranao phonology: heavy consonants and raised vowels (* > ). Aspirated consonants also developed in a similar way in Southern (Lapuyan) Subanon, but without the vowel-raising.

Grammar

Case markers 
In contrast to Tagalog which has three case markers, and Iloko which has two, Maranao has four:.

Pronouns 
Maranao pronouns can be free or bound to the word/morpheme before it.

Common words 
Below are common words found in Maranao sentences, their translations in English, Cebuano, and Tagalog, and similar words in distant Philippine languages.

Sample texts

Universal Declaration of Human Rights 
Maranao:    .      
Cebuano:    .      
English:    .

Noun phrases 
These phrases were taken from Alonto's Maranao Drills.

Time and Space

Verbs and Time

Negatives

Manga, A, Aden, Da

Object-focus Sentences

See also 
Languages of the Philippines

References

External links
Bansa.org,  Maranao Dictionary
Maranao at Omniglot
Maranao at Wiktionary
The files for a Maranao lexical database with English glosses are archived with Kaipuleohone 
SEAlang Library Maranao Resources
SIL Philippines Maranao - English Dictionary

Danao languages
Languages of Lanao del Sur
Languages of Lanao del Norte
Languages of the Philippines
Languages of Sabah
Languages of Malaysia